Coatepeque also known as Village of gardenias is a town and municipality in the Quetzaltenango department of Guatemala.  According to the 2018 census, the town of Coatepeque had a population of 37,330.

Climate

Coatepeque has a tropical monsoon climate (Am) with moderate to little rainfall from December to March and heavy to very heavy rainfall from April to November.

Structures
Archaeology

Takalik Abaj is nearby.

Capabilities

Organizations

People

Events
Sports

Deportivo Coatepeque football club play in the Liga Nacional (the Major National League) of Guatemalan Football. The Serpientes Rojas play their home games in the Israel Barrios Stadium (capacity 24,000, natural grass turf).

Geographic location
The Coatepeque urban area has 22 neighborhoods, and its rural area has 15 middle sized villages and 25 small sized ones.

References

External links

Municipalities of the Quetzaltenango Department